Nosson Meir Wachtfogel (18 February 1910 in Kuliai, Lithuania – 21 November 1998 in Lakewood, New Jersey, USA), known as the Lakewood Mashgiach, was an Orthodox rabbi and long-time mashgiach ruchani (spiritual supervisor) of Beth Medrash Govoha (the Lakewood Yeshiva) in Lakewood, New Jersey. He was one of the primary builders of that yeshiva into a world-class institution, enacting the goals and direction set forth by its founding rosh yeshiva, Rabbi Aharon Kotler. He also helped establish "branches" of the Lakewood Yeshiva in dozens of cities, and pioneered the community kollel concept with the opening of combination Torah learning/outreach centers in the United States and other countries. A revered mentor and guide to thousands of students over a career that spanned more than 50 years, he was a strong advocate and prime example of musar study and working on one's spiritual self-development.

Early life
Nosson Meir Wachtfogel was born on 9 Adar I, 1910, in the small Lithuanian town of Kuliai, where his father, Rabbi Moshe Yom Tov Wachtfogel, was rav. His father was a student of the Alter of Slabodka and one of the original 14 students of the Eitz Chaim Yeshiva in Slutsk headed by Rabbi Isser Zalman Meltzer.

Nosson Meir studied in the Kelm Talmud Torah as a youth. In the early 1920s, his father accepted a rabbinical post in Montreal, Quebec, Canada and moved there with his mother, while Nosson Meir remained in Kuhl to complete his mesivta program. At age 15 he rejoined his parents in Canada and then went to learn at Yeshiva University's Yeshivas Rabbeinu Yitzchak Elchanan in New York. Among his study partners were future American rabbinical leaders Rabbis Avigdor Miller, Moshe Bick, and Yehuda Davis.

A few years later, when the yeshiva added secular studies to its curriculum, Nosson Meir staged a protest, urging his friends to quit the yeshiva and go to study in the great yeshivas of Europe. At age 17, he himself enrolled at the Mir yeshiva in the town of Mir, Belarus, where he remained for seven years. The musar emphasis and personal example of the Mir mashgiach, Rabbi Yeruchom Levovitz, and his successor, Rabbi Yechezkel Levenstein, had a profound influence on Wachtfogel, who devoted the rest of his life to studying and disseminating musar and working on personal character development. He also studied under Rabbi Boruch Ber Leibowitz, rosh yeshiva of the Kaminetz yeshiva in Poland.

When Wachtfogel's mentor, Rabbi Levovitz, died in the summer of 1936, he decided to return to Canada. At that point he received semicha (rabbinic ordination) from Rabbi Leibowitz and Rabbi Shimon Shkop, rosh yeshiva of the Grodno yeshiva. He also received semicha from Rabbi Eliezer Yehuda Finkel, rosh yeshiva of the Mir.

When his ship reached New York, he heard that Rabbi Elchonon Wasserman, rosh yeshiva of the Baranowitz Yeshiva, was fund-raising in that city, and went to talk with him about his concerns about living in materialistic America. Rabbi Wasserman advised him to return immediately to Europe and study in the Kelm Talmud Torah, which was known for its strong emphasis on musar and character-building. Although he had not seen or spoken to his parents for seven years, Wachtfogel received their blessings to return to Europe. He remained in Kelm for over three years, studying mostly under Rabbi Daniel Movshovitz. Even after World War II broke out, he continued to learn in the yeshiva, astounding those who found out he could leave any time with his Canadian passport. Near the end of this period, he became engaged to Chava Shlomowitz, daughter of Rabbi Yisrael Zalman Shlomowitz (Rav of Geniendz) and a graduate of Sarah Schenirer's teacher's seminary in Kraków.

In June 1940, the Russians entered Kelm as part of the Russian occupation of the Baltic states and proceeded to confiscate businesses, enforce rationing, and put their sympathizers in control. British citizens in Kelm were advised by the British Consulate in Kovno to travel to Kovno and from there to be evacuated to Australia. Wachtfogel and another Canadian learning in Kelm, Rabbi Shmuel Shecter, together with Wachtfogel's bride, Chava Slomowitz, joined a group of British citizens stranded in Kelm—including the wife and daughter of Rabbi Eliyahu Eliezer Dessler—and a group from the Telshe Yeshiva on their flight to Australia. In order to procure a visa for his bride, Wachtfogel had to prove that they were married. They did this by conducting the first half of their Jewish marriage ceremony, erusin, in Kovno; their chuppah took place after they reached Montreal.

The group departed on a Shabbat, 26 October 1940, taking a train to Moscow via Riga. The next day they boarded the Trans-Siberian Express to Vladivostok, a journey of nine days, during which the religious Jews had nothing to eat but fruit and tea. From Vladivostok, they traveled by steamship to Brisbane, a voyage of nearly four and a half weeks (here their rations were limited to sardines, eggs, and tomatoes). While the British citizens in the group spent over six years in Australia waiting to be repatriated, Wachtfogel, Schechter and Wachtfogel's bride were given first-class tickets to New York by the Board of Governors of the Australian Jewish community, which feared that these Torah scholars would foment a religious revival in their community.

Mashgiach
In spring 1942 R’Wachtfogel and 19 other avreichim (young married men) started the first kollel in America, called Beth Medrash Govoha, in White Plains, New York. Seeking a great Torah scholar to head their learning program, they offered the position to Rabbi Aharon Kotler. R’ Kotler agreed, but asked that they move the kollel to Lakewood, New Jersey, and admit bachurim (unmarried young men) in order to turn it into a full-scale, European-style yeshiva. The avreichim agreed and became Rabbi Kotler's first students when he founded Beth Medrash Govoha. In 1943 Kotler asked Wachtfogel to become the yeshiva's mashgiach ruchani, a position he held for more than 50 years until his death, serving under three successive generations of roshei yeshiva: Rabbis Aharon Kotler, Shneur Kotler, and Malkiel Kotler.

Even as mashgiach, he acted more like a student of Rabbi Kotler, attending the rosh yeshiva shiurim (Torah lectures) and shmuessim (musar talks) with the rest of the students. Out of respect for his Rav, he never gave a shmuess of his own in the main study hall as long as Kotler was alive.

In addition to caring for the students' welfare, Wachtfogel was the guardian and implementer of the spirit and goals which Kotler intended for his yeshiva, including the emphasis on Torah and musar study. He also worked to fulfill Kotler's dream of establishing "branches" of the Lakewood Yeshiva in other cities, convincing the communities and the potential teachers and students of the viability of this novel undertaking. In this fashion, he helped to establish kollels in 30 cities, including Montreal, Boston, Long Beach, New York, Scranton, Pennsylvania, Miami Beach, Denver, Pittsburgh, Deal, New Jersey, Mexico, and Melbourne. The Talmudical Yeshiva of Philadelphia, founded in 1953 with Rabbis Shmuel Kamenetzky and Dov Schwartzman as roshei yeshiva, was a direct result of Wachtfogel's efforts.

Ba'al Musar
Wachtfogel was a living example of a baal musar, one who strives through spiritual self-development and prayer to perfect himself and his service of God. A paragon of humility and self-effacement, he avoided anger and honor at all costs, and made do with the barest of necessities, even declining to ask for a raise in salary. For many years he lived in a room in the yeshiva dormitory, coming home only for Shabbat. (His wife was one of the main teachers at the Bais Yaakov High School and Seminary in Williamsburg led by Rebbetzin Vichna Kaplan.) Even after his family joined him, he never owned his own house, and would refer to his house as a stantzia (inn) and his furniture as heltzer (lumber). He was also known for his firm conviction in the coming of Mashiach, ending his shmuessen with the words "This is the last shmuess in galus (exile)". He kept a pressed suit hanging in his closet so that he would have something to wear to greet the Mashiach as soon as he arrived.

His spirit was felt throughout the Lakewood community. For example, he and Rabbi Shneur Kotler established the annual "Shabbos Hatzolah" campaign which provides most of the operating budget for the local Hatzolah ambulance service.

Under the leadership of Rabbi Shneur Kotler, when yeshiva enrollment expanded from 200 to 800 students, and under the leadership of Rabbis Malkiel Kotler, Yerucham Olshin, Dovid Schustal, and Yisroel Neuman, when the student body mushroomed to over 2,300, Wachtfogel was aided by assistant mashgichim Rabbis Yehudah Jacobs, Eliezer Stefansky, and Yaakov Pollack. At the end of the 1990s, Wachtfogel brought in Rabbi Matisyohu Salomon, mashgiach of the Gateshead Yeshiva, to serve alongside him and eventually be his successor.

Community kollel pioneer
In the 1960s and onwards, Wachtfogel was a key force in the establishment of community kollels in the United States and other countries. Unlike a kollel, which is a full-time learning program, a "community kollel" is a part-time learning program, part-time outreach program. Its Torah scholars learn together in the morning and afternoon and then interact with lay members of the community by offering evening lectures and one-on-one learning. Serving as a hub of Torah activity, community kollels make a significant impact on the growth of Torah awareness in remote Jewish areas. Under the guidance of Rabbi Shneur Kotler, Wachtfogel oversaw the opening of community kollels in many cities, including Passaic, New Jersey (this kollel developed into the Yeshiva Gedola of Passaic), Chicago, Pittsburgh, Detroit, Los Angeles, Toronto, and Melbourne, Australia. As he recruited students from the Lakewood Yeshiva to staff these new locations, he gave his blessing to many who were reluctant to move to small communities that lacked the Jewish infrastructure (Jewish schooling, kosher food, employment opportunities) available in larger cities, and even engaged in "arm-twisting" to convince the students that they would be successful.

In his final years, he founded and directed a new organization called Kollel International to fund-raise and establish kollels in small communities. Two such kollels were founded near Lakewood, in Manalapan Township and Howell Township, New Jersey, before his death. Less than a week before his death, he was still involved in establishing another kollel on Long Island.

Final years

In 1997 Wachtfogel and Rabbi Shlomo Wolbe led a delegation of senior rabbis, roshei yeshiva and mashgichim to try to save a Jewish cemetery from destruction in the city of Kaliningrad. The mayor said that the sight of these venerable old men who undertook the journey to Russia to protest the grave desecration prompted him to sign the permit for its protection.

Wachtfogel died on 21 November 1998. On the Hebrew calendar, his yahrtzeit, 2 Kislev, is the same as that of Rabbi Aharon Kotler. He was buried in the new Chelkas HaRabbonim (rabbinical section) of the Har HaMenuchot cemetery in Jerusalem, Israel.

His son, Rabbi Elya Ber Wachtfogel, is rosh yeshiva of the Yeshiva of South Fallsburg, New York. After his father's death, Rabbi Elya Ber assumed the leadership of Kollel International together with Rabbi Malkiel Kotler.

Bibliography
Kovetz Sichos Vol.  1-6
Leket Reshimot B'inyanei Beit Hamikdash
Leket Reshimot B'inyanei Chanukah
Leket Reshimot B'inyanei Elul v'Yamim Nora'im
Leket Reshimot B'inyanei Tefillah
Noam Hamusar

References

Sources

1910 births
1998 deaths
People from Plungė District Municipality
People from Telshevsky Uyezd
Lithuanian Haredi rabbis
Beth Medrash Govoha
Mashgiach ruchani
Musar movement
American Haredi rabbis
Lithuanian emigrants to the United States
American people of Lithuanian-Jewish descent
People from Lakewood Township, New Jersey
Burials at Har HaMenuchot
Rabbis from New Jersey
Mir Yeshiva alumni
20th-century American rabbis